Malik Buari (born 21 January 1984) is a former professional football midfielder and left-sided defender. He has represented England in international youth squads.

Club career
Buari was formerly at Fulham, making his debut in the Premier League against Everton on 23 August 2003. He failed to score in the five first team games he played for Fulham before moving to Woking on a free transfer.

New Zealand Knights
Buari was one of the many signings made by new coach Paul Nevin intended to help improve on the disastrous inaugural A-League season. Buari impressed in pre-season but he really made a name for himself in Round Two. The Knights had held Adelaide United at 0–0 for the whole match when in the 88th minute, Buari released a 25-metre thunderbolt which went straight into the top corner to win the game and also secure the Knights first home win ever.

International career
Buari made a handful of appearances for England under-15s and under-16s.

References

External links
 Bio and photograph on a site about footballers from Ghana playing abroad

Living people
1984 births
Footballers from Accra
Association football defenders
Association football midfielders
Ghanaian footballers
English footballers
Fulham F.C. players
Woking F.C. players
New Zealand Knights FC players
Sutton United F.C. players
St Albans City F.C. players
Chessington & Hook United F.C. players
Premier League players
A-League Men players
Ghanaian expatriate footballers
Expatriate association footballers in New Zealand